George Hollis VC (October 1833 – 16 May 1879) was an English recipient of the Victoria Cross, the highest and most prestigious award for gallantry in the face of the enemy that can be awarded to British and Commonwealth forces.

Details
He was about 24 years old, and a Farrier in the 8th Hussars (The King's Royal Irish), British Army during the Indian Mutiny when the following deed took place on 17 June 1858 at Gwalior, India for which he was awarded the VC:
Farrier Hollis - together with a captain (Clement Walker Heneage), a sergeant (Joseph Ward) and a private (John Pearson) was in a charge made by a squadron of the 8th Hussars. His citation reads:

Medal
In 1994 a man watching racehorses being trained on the Curragh in County Kildare, Ireland, glimpsed a small piece of metal being thrown up with mud by a horse galloping by; this turned out to be a Victoria Cross (minus its bar). It was presumed to have been one of the four awarded to the 8th Hussars, as they were based at the Curragh between 1869 and 1875. Until 1881 soldiers were required to wear all their medals while on duty and it was believed that a member of the Hussars could have lost the medal while training on horseback on the Curragh. It was thought likely that the medal belonged to either George Hollis or John Pearson as the other two medals were accounted for; however, Pearson's VC subsequently turned up in auction at 2004, along with his other medals.

References

Location of grave and VC medal (Devonshire)

1833 births
1879 deaths
8th King's Royal Irish Hussars soldiers
British recipients of the Victoria Cross
Indian Rebellion of 1857 recipients of the Victoria Cross
People from Chipping Sodbury
British Army recipients of the Victoria Cross